Macarostola miltopepla is a moth of the family Gracillariidae. It is known from Queensland, Australia.

References

External links
image at boldsystems.org

Macarostola
Moths described in 1926